Line 2 of the Tianjin Metro is a rapid transit line running from west to east Tianjin. Opened on 1 July 2012, the line is 27.157 km long and has 20 stations. It is mostly underground; all stations, with the exception of surface-level station Caozhuang, are underground.

In May 2011, during construction, a section of tunnel west of Tianjin railway station was flooded with water from the Hai River and collapsed, trapping one of the TBMs. It was deemed too expensive to remove the trapped TBM, so a decision to abandon the TBM and dig a new tunnel around it was made. This delayed the original opening date from late 2011 to 2012. After the line opened for trial operations on 1 July 2012, it operated in two separate sections until the affected section finished reconstruction and Jianguodao Station opened on 28 August 2013, finally reconnecting the two sections.

Opening timeline

Stations (west to east)

Rolling Stock

References

Tianjin Metro lines
750 V DC railway electrification
Railway lines opened in 2012
Airport rail links in China